The women's 70 kg competition at the 2020 European Judo Championships was held on 20 November at the O2 Arena.

Results

Final

Repechage

Top half

Bottom half

References

External links
 

W70
European Judo Championships Women's Middleweight
European W70